Dorota Horzonek-Jokiel (3 February 1934 – 26 May 1992) was a Polish gymnast. She competed at the 1952 Summer Olympics and the 1956 Summer Olympics, winning a bronze medal at the latter.

References

1934 births
1992 deaths
Polish female artistic gymnasts
Olympic gymnasts of Poland
Gymnasts at the 1952 Summer Olympics
Gymnasts at the 1956 Summer Olympics
Sportspeople from Ruda Śląska
Olympic medalists in gymnastics
Olympic bronze medalists for Poland
Medalists at the 1956 Summer Olympics
20th-century Polish women